Hydrelia microptera is a moth in the family Geometridae first described by Hiroshi Inoue in 1987. It is found in China and Nepal.

References

Moths described in 1987
Asthenini
Moths of Asia